Ophuls may refer to:

Max Ophüls (1902–1957), German-born film director who adopted the spelling "Ophuls"
Marcel Ophuls (born 1927), Max Ophüls' son, German-born film director with French and American citizenship who adopted the same spelling
William Ophuls, the pen name of Patrick Ophuls, (born 1934), American pioneer in modern environmental movement.